Christian Mathenia (born 31 March 1992) is a German professional footballer who plays as a goalkeeper for 1. FC Nürnberg in the 2. Bundesliga.

Club career 
Mathenia joined SV Darmstadt 98 in 2014 from 1. FSV Mainz 05 II on a free transfer. He made his 2. Bundesliga debut on 3 August 2014 against SV Sandhausen in a 1–0 home win. He went on to become first-choice keeper for the remaining season featuring in all of the 35 games in the league and cup keeping the most clean sheets in the process.

Mathenia joined Hamburger SV in 2016 from SV Darmstadt 98.

References

External links 
 

1992 births
Living people
Sportspeople from Mainz
German footballers
Footballers from Rhineland-Palatinate
Association football goalkeepers
2. Bundesliga players
Bundesliga players
BFV Hassia Bingen players
1. FSV Mainz 05 II players
SV Darmstadt 98 players
Hamburger SV players
1. FC Nürnberg players